In video games, a raid is a type of mission in massively multiplayer online role-playing games (MMORPGs) where a number of people attempt to defeat either: (a) another number of people at player-vs-player (PVP), (b) a series of computer-controlled enemies (non-player characters; NPCs) in a player-vs-environment (PVE) battlefield, or (c) a very powerful boss (superboss). This type of objective usually occurs within an instance dungeon, a separate server instance from the other players in the game. 

In military real-time strategy (RTS) games like StarCraft, "raids" usually refer to the military tactic.

Origin 
The term itself stems from the military definition of 'a sudden attack and/or seizure of some objective'.

Raiding originated in the class of text MUDs known as DikuMUD, which in turn heavily influenced the 1999 MMORPG EverQuest, which brought the raiding concept into modern 3D MMORPGs. As of 2019, the largest and most popular game to feature raiding is Blizzard's 2004 MMORPG World of Warcraft.

Raid tactics 
The combat encounters comprising a raid usually require players to coordinate with one another while performing specific roles as members of a team. The roles of Tank, Healer, and Damage Dealer are known as the "Holy Trinity" of MMORPG group composition. Other common roles include Buffing, Crowd control, and Pulling (selectively choosing targets with which to initiate combat). A raid leader is often needed to direct the group efficiently, due to the complexities of keeping many players working well together.

Raid loot 
Raids are often very rewarding in terms of virtual treasure and items that are unique or that grant exceptional stats and abilities, thus giving players an incentive to participate. Often however, there is not enough treasure to reward individually every player who participates. Players have invented various systems, such as Dragon kill points to distribute loot fairly.

Raiding guilds 
Raiding is often done by associations of players called guilds or clans who maintain a consistent schedule and roster. There are two types of raiding guilds: casual guilds, defined as spending two to three days per week on average; and hardcore guilds, defined as spending four to seven days per week on average.

Health risks 
The fact that raids often require multiple consecutive hours of constant gameplay leads some to believe it is a physically unhealthy activity. A 2003 study by the National Institutes of Health found that playing MMORPGs for more than 20 hours per week correlates with obesity and nutritional imbalance as well as an increased propensity for bone loss and muscle atrophy. Due to these concerns, China has proposed national limits on how long people can play MMORPGs. The measures will impose penalties on people who play MMORPGs for more than 3 hours per day.

Game raids 
Game raids are commonly organized by internet celebrities with the intent to protest against the company's behavior, their actions or simply for fun. They normally consist of players creating their characters with pre-discussed appearances, and stacking up the game servers until they have their demands meet, or they tire themselves out. A popular raider is Quackity, who streams his raids on Twitch.

References

Massively multiplayer online role-playing games
Video game terminology